Marjorie Rees Clark (later Smith, 6 November 1909 – 15 June 1993) was a South African former track and field athlete, who competed in the 1928 Summer Olympics and in the 1932 Summer Olympics. She was born in Bulwer, KwaZulu-Natal and competed for the Albion Ladies Athletic Club.

In 1928 Clark finished fifth in the Olympic high jump event. She also participated in the 100 m competition, but was eliminated in the semi-finals. Four years later she won the bronze medal in the 80 m hurdles contest at the 1932 Olympics. In the 1932 high jump event she finished fifth again and in the 100 m competition, but was eliminated in the first round.

Also at 1928 Women's Amateur Association Championships Miss Clark won both the 100 yds hurdles & high jump.

At the 1934 British Empire Games she won the gold medal in the 80 m hurdles contest as well as in the high jump event. As a member of the South African relay team she finished fourth in the 110-220-110 yards competition. In the 100 yards contest and in the 220 yards event she was eliminated in the first round.

References

External links
Profile at databaseOlympics

1909 births
1993 deaths
People from Ingwe Local Municipality
Colony of Natal people
White South African people
South African female sprinters
South African female hurdlers
South African female high jumpers
Olympic athletes of South Africa
Athletes (track and field) at the 1928 Summer Olympics
Athletes (track and field) at the 1932 Summer Olympics
Olympic bronze medalists for South Africa
Athletes (track and field) at the 1934 British Empire Games
Commonwealth Games gold medallists for South Africa
Commonwealth Games medallists in athletics
Medalists at the 1932 Summer Olympics
Olympic bronze medalists in athletics (track and field)
Olympic female sprinters
Olympic female hurdlers
Olympic female high jumpers
Medallists at the 1934 British Empire Games